The Model 1914 grenade (Ручная граната образца 1914 года > Ruchnaya granata obraztsa 1914 goda, "Hand Grenade Pattern of year 1914") is a Russian stick concussion grenade (fragmentation grenade via an optional jacket) that was used during World War I and World War II.

Operation
The M1914 is a time-delayed grenade. To activate it, the user must hold the grenade with the safety pin between two fingers, move the safety catch so that it is away from the hammer's front, then throw it. The safety pin is released as soon as the grenade is thrown.

History

Origins

The M1914 is a heavily modified Model 1912 grenade. The head of the grenade went from a box to a cylinder, the wooden handle was removed in favor of a welded sheet of metal and the belt hook was removed.

World War I
The M1914 was one of the few grenades used the conflict that was in service before the war started. It was used throughout the war, along with the Stender grenade, by Russian forces until Russia withdrew from the conflict in 1917.

Inter-war
In 1930, the M1914 was modified to use a different explosive, TNT. TNT was a common explosive in Soviet grenades at the time, as seen in grenades such as the F1 grenade and RGD-33 grenade.

World War II
The M1914/30 also saw use in World War II, but it was eventually replaced by the RGD-33 grenade as the Soviet's primary stick grenade.
The Axis forces used captured M1914/30 grenades, which they classified as the HG 336(r), or Handgranate 336 (russische).

Post-World War II
After World War II, the M1914 was completely retired in favor of other designs, such as the RGD-5 grenade. However, inert versions of the M1914 were used for training up until the 1980s.

Variants

M1914/30
The M1914/30 is a variant of the M1914 that uses TNT instead of Picric Acid. Otherwise, it is exactly the same as the M1914.

M1917 Chemical
The M1917 is a modified and larger M1914 that expels chemical gas when it "detonates". The primary chemical agent in this grenade is 500g of Chloropicrin, which is an irritant. The M1917 can be told apart from the M1914 because it is larger than the M1914 and has a skull and crossbones on it with the Russian word for chemical underneath the image.

Fragmentation Sleeve
The M1914 has an optional fragmentation sleeve that turns the M1914 into a fragmentation grenade. The sleeve's pattern was later used on the RGD-33 grenade's fragmentation sleeve.

See also
 List of Russian weaponry

References

Sources 
 А. А. Благонравов, М. В. Гуревич. Боеприпасы стрелкового вооружения. Патроны, ручные и ружейные гранаты. Их устройство. Ленинград, издание военно-технической академии РККА имени тов. Дзержинского, 1932. - 210 стр.

External links
 Pictures of the M1914 and its fragmentation sleeve
 Information about the M1917 Chemical variant

World War I Russian infantry weapons
World War II infantry weapons of the Soviet Union
Hand grenades of the Russian Empire
Hand grenades of the Soviet Union
Concussion grenades

ru:РГ-14